Sibyl Buck (born May 27, 1972) is an American musician, yoga instructor, and fashion model.

Biography 
Born in Versailles, France, Buck started her modeling career in 1992 and has worked for Yves Saint-Laurent, Chanel, Jean-Paul Gaultier, Alexander McQueen, and many other fashion houses.

After quitting the modeling industry in 1998, Buck became a mother and began playing rock music in bands. She played bass and sang in Champions of Sound with Chris Traynor of Orange 9mm and Helmet, and with Sergio Vega of Quicksand. In 2007 she recorded and performed with Joseph Arthur as a member of his backing band The Lonely Astronauts, appearing on his Let's Just Be, Temporary People, and The Graduation Ceremony albums.  Buck played bass guitar for Bush in 2012, filling in for Corey Britz for a few shows. She is currently performing with the band High Desert Fires', and appears on the debut album Light is the Revelation.

Buck also acted, playing the personal assistant of Zorg in the 1997 film, The Fifth Element.

In 2008, Buck moved to Topanga Canyon and became a full-time yoga instructor.

References

External links 
 
 
 

1972 births
Living people
American female models
People from Versailles
American film actresses
Women bass guitarists
The Lonely Astronauts members
21st-century American women singers
21st-century American bass guitarists